Thee is an archaic form of 'you'.

Thee may also refer to:
 Thee (1981 film), Tamil film about two brothers: one a policeman, the other a smuggler
 Thee (2009 film), Tamil film about an honest policeman who becomes a corrupt politician
 Stephan Thee, German footballer
 Megan Thee Stallion, American rapper